Gjorgi Abadžiev (7 October 1910 in Dojran, Ottoman Empire – 2 August 1963 in Skopje, SFR Yugoslavia) (also spelled Georgi Abadzhiev) was a Macedonian prosaist and publicist. From 1915 to 1948 he lived in Bulgaria where he studied at the Faculty of Law in Sofia (1932-1937). Later he moved to SR Macedonia where he became a historian and writer. Abadžiev died on August 2, 1963 in Skopje. He published his works in Bulgarian, Macedonian and Serbian.

Novel collections
 Labour and people (1936)
 Izgrev (1951)
 Posledna sredba (1953)
 Aramijsko gnezdo (1954)
 Pustina (1961)
 Balkanske vojne (1972) (in Serbian)

References

 Slovenski veliki leksikon, Mladinska knjiga (2003)

1910 births
1963 deaths
Yugoslav writers
20th-century male writers
Macedonian short story writers
Bulgarian emigrants to Yugoslavia
Macedonian communists
Writers from Skopje
20th-century short story writers